Rob Hisey (born September 24, 1984) is a Canadian former professional ice hockey player. He last played for the Grizzlys Wolfsburg in the Deutsche Eishockey Liga (DEL).

Playing career
Hisey played in the OHL, UCHL and ECHL until 2005. Undrafted, he took his game overseas, playing for Ässät of Finland in 2005-06, followed by stints in Germany (Hannover Scorpions) and another stay at Ässät, before representing Austrian side Graz 99ers and Mora IK in Sweden. He then spent the 2008-09 season with the Hannover Indians in Germany. In the 2009-10 campaign, Hisey split time between CHL's Tulsa Oilers and the Springfield Falcons of the AHL.

On August 18, 2010, Hisey was signed as an unrestricted free agent to a one-year two-way contract by the New York Islanders. He was assigned to American Hockey League affiliate, the Bridgeport Sound Tigers, for the duration of the 2010–11 season.

Despite scoring 48 points in 59 games with the Sound Tigers, Hisey never played with the Islanders and on April 29, 2011, signed a one-year contract with Austrian club, EHC Black Wings Linz. He won the Austrian championship with Linz in 2012 and eventually stayed with the team until mid-February 2017, when he signed with the Grizzlys Wolfsburg of the German DEL.

Personal
Rob and his wife Brooke have three sons, Hudson, Cohen and Colton.

Career statistics

References

External links

1984 births
Living people
Ässät players
Barrie Colts players
Bridgeport Sound Tigers players
EHC Black Wings Linz players
Erie Otters players
Hannover Scorpions players
Graz 99ers players
Mora IK players
Port Huron Beacons players
Reading Royals players
Sault Ste. Marie Greyhounds players
Springfield Falcons players
Tulsa Oilers (1992–present) players
Grizzlys Wolfsburg players
Canadian expatriate ice hockey players in Austria
Canadian expatriate ice hockey players in Finland
Canadian expatriate ice hockey players in Germany
Canadian expatriate ice hockey players in Sweden
Canadian expatriate ice hockey players in the United States
Canadian ice hockey centres